Samuli Kivimäki (born August 9, 1988) is a Finnish professional ice hockey right winger who is a free agent.

He previously played professionally in Finland's Liiga for Lukko, Ilves and Vaasan Sport.

He last signed with Pionniers de Chamonix-Mont Blanc in the Ligue Magnus in France on June 17, 2019, but left the team four months later due to injury without ever playing for the team.

References

External links

1988 births
Living people
Asplöven HC players
Brest Albatros Hockey players
Finnish ice hockey right wingers
Ilves players
Lempäälän Kisa players
Lukko players
Nybro Vikings players
Sportspeople from Vaasa
Vaasan Sport players